Percy Graham Walsingham (born 1888) was an English professional footballer who played as a forward.

Career
After playing in England for Millwall, Clapton Orient and Chelmsford, Walsingham moved to Italy to play for Genoa and Bologna.

References

1888 births
Year of death missing
Footballers from Greater London
English footballers
Millwall F.C. players
Leyton Orient F.C. players
Chelmsford City F.C. players
Bologna F.C. 1909 players
Genoa C.F.C. players
English expatriate footballers
Expatriate footballers in Italy
English expatriate sportspeople in Italy
Association football forwards